Gregory Smith (born June 18, 1996) is a Canadian curler from St. John's, Newfoundland and Labrador. He currently skips his own team out of the RE/MAX Centre.

Career
Smith skipped Team Newfoundland and Labrador at two consecutive Canadian Junior Curling Championships in 2015 and 2016 with his team of Ryan McNeil Lamswood, Kyle Barron and Craig Laing. In 2015, they had a 3–6 eleventh-place finish and in 2016, they finished in ninth with a 5–4 record. While still in juniors, Smith and his team played in the 2015 GSOC Tour Challenge Tier 2 which was held in Paradise, Newfoundland and Labrador. There, they finished with a winless 0–4 record.

Smith played in his first Newfoundland and Labrador Tankard in 2018 with his new team of Matthew Hunt, Andrew Taylor and Ian Withycombe. The team had a successful tournament, finishing the round robin with a perfect 8–0 and defeating Andrew Symonds 9–6 in the final to claim the provincial title. Representing Newfoundland and Labrador at the 2018 Tim Hortons Brier, they finished with a 1–7 record, only defeating Yukon's Thomas Scoffin. The team could not defend their provincial title the following season, losing out in the C Event quarterfinals.

During the 2019–20 season, Smith competed in his second Grand Slam of Curling event at the 2019 Tour Challenge Tier 2 in Westville Road, Nova Scotia where he once again finished 0–4. At the 2020 Newfoundland and Labrador Tankard, his team lost in a tiebreaker to Colin Thomas.

Smith won his second provincial championship in 2021 at the 2021 Newfoundland and Labrador Tankard, defeating Colin Thomas 9–8 in a double extra end. He improved his record from 2018 at the 2021 Tim Hortons Brier, finishing with a 2–6 record. Also in 2021, Smith competed in the 2021 Canadian Mixed Doubles Curling Championship with partner Mackenzie Mitchell. The duo finished 4–2 in the round robin, qualifying Newfoundland and Labrador for the playoffs for the first time in the event's history. They then lost in the round of 12 qualifying round to Kadriana Sahaidak and Colton Lott, officially eliminating them from the tournament.

Politics
Outside of curling, Smith ran for a  seat on St. John's City Council in a by-election in 2020 in Ward 2. He ended up placing fourth with 586 votes (11%). Smith ran for an at-large council seat on the St. John's City Council in the 2021 municipal election. Smith was unsuccessful, placing seventh. Smith supported Jean Charest in the 2022 Conservative Party of Canada leadership election.

Personal life
Smith works as the curling coordinator and an instructor at the Bally Haly Curling Club. He previously attended Booth Memorial High School.  He is pansexual.

Teams

References

External links

1996 births
Living people
Canadian male curlers
Curlers from Newfoundland and Labrador
Sportspeople from St. John's, Newfoundland and Labrador
Canadian LGBT sportspeople
LGBT curlers
Canadian sportsperson-politicians
Bisexual sportspeople
Bisexual men